The Deasy family was mainly concentrated in Waterford and West Cork at the time that James Joyce wrote Ulysses. However, the name was already known as the college friend and political ally of Daniel O'Connell, Rickard Deasy, instituted the Deasy Land Act, which was intended to reform tenants' rights. Also Captain Timothy Deasy was one of the prisoners rescued from a prison van in Manchester by Fenians in a famous incident in 1867.

Latter day members of the clan include Austin Deasy, who became minister for agriculture from 1982 - 1987.

Notable Deasys
Henry Hugh Peter Deasy - (1866-1947) automotive pioneer.
Conor Deasy - Irish pop band The Thrills singer
Austin Deasy - Irish politician
Tim Deasy - English footballer
John Deasy - Irish politician
Liam Deasy - Irish Republican Army officer during war of independence
Bill Deasy - American singer-songwriter, recording artist and author
Daniel Deasy -  Democratic member of the Pennsylvania House of Representatives
Timothy Deasy -  Captain in the Irish Republican Brotherhood
Mike Deasy - Guitarist and member of The Wrecking Crew

Surnames of Irish origin